Catherine Widgery  (born 1953) is an American artist. Widgery is known for both her studio-based sculpture work and her public sculpture.

Early life
Widgery was born in Pittsburgh, Pennsylvania. She received a Bachelor of Arts degree from Yale University in 1975 where she graduated cum laude and was awarded special distinction in Fine Arts and the Walker Prize for 'outstanding artistic achievement" by the Fine Arts Faculty.

Personal life 
Widgery has lived in different parts of the world US, Canada, London and Rome and Guatemala. She lived in Montreal from 1979 until 2000, when she moved to Truro, Massachusettswhere she lived until 2004 before moving to Guatemala. She currently divides her time between Guatemala and the Boston area.

Public art
Widgery has built more than 40 public art installations across the US and Canada.

Widgery's public art projects include:
 Woven Light, Denver, Colorado,
 Halo, Collège Bourget de Rigaud, Quebec,
 Shadow Play, Mill Avenue/Third Street station, Valley Metro Light Rail, Tempe, Arizona,
 Leaves of Wind, El Paso, Texas,
 City People, Royal Bank Plaza, Toronto, Canada,
 Sky Circles, Warm Springs BART station, Fremont, California,
 River Arch, Norwood Bridge, Winnipeg, Manitoba, 
 Trail of Dreams, Trail of Ghosts, Santa Fe, New Mexico, 
 The facade for the Rideau Centre, Ottawa,
 Four artworks installed in Montreal, Quebec, under the Public Art program of the City of Montreal:
 Icarus
 The Passing Song
 Le Vent Se Lève
 
 Lightscape (with cj fleury), Blair O-Train station, Ottawa
 Crystal Light, North Temple Bridge/Guadalupe station and North Temple station in Salt Lake City
Pass Through The Land, Denver, Colorado

Collections
Her work is included in the collections of the Musée d'art contemporain de Montréal and the Musée national des beaux-arts du Québec.

References

External links

 

1953 births
Living people
20th-century American women artists
21st-century American women artists
20th-century American sculptors
21st-century American sculptors
Artists from Pittsburgh
Sculptors from Pennsylvania
Yale University alumni
Members of the Royal Canadian Academy of Arts